Toltecayotl is a Nahuatl word derived from "tōltēcātl" which as used by the Nahuas to refer to the members of the Toltec civilization that preceded them in the basin of Mexico, as well as a generalized meaning of "artisan".

Modern use 
The introduction and dissemination of that title in the academic world is due to anthropologist Miguel León-Portilla who, in 1980, published a book titled Tōltēcayōtl, aspects of the Nahuatl culture.

León Portilla's interpretation of the concept of Toltecayotl is based on a set of principles that were collected in the Huēhuehtlahtōlli or 'book of the ancient words', which includes traditional parliaments preserved by oral tradition and other documents. The main are the following:

Criticism of the use of the term 
Toltequity is also the generic name given to the tōltēca knowledge, or knowledge left by the ancient inhabitants of Tollan-Xicocotitlan Tula ("Tollan-Xicocotitlan") (Hidalgo, Mexico). Not used in University environments, nor in archaeological analysis (see "Tōltēcayōtl, aspects of the Nahuatl culture" from Miguel León-Portilla, anthropologist and Mexican historian and leading authority in the field of thought and literature Nahuatl. Since 1988 he is emeritus researcher at the National Autonomous University of Mexico.)

The historical validity of toltequity as such tends to be controversial, historians do not even agree in the Toltec city which is known as such, Tula is usually considered (the settlement known as the "Chico") as the base around year 550, and is closely related to the Quetzalcoatl history, while there are four origins, all agree in that he was a King, son of Mixcōātl and Chimalma, and who later was worshipped as God, and later would become one of the main gods in the Anahuac. While the Toltec gave rise to the founding of a legendary city called Tula or Tōllan ("Tōl-+-tlan" = Capital, the name of the Toltec city itself was "Xicocotitlan").

The Toltec sources 
Toltec was a generic name applied to all inhabitants of Mesoamerica. Derived from the root tol-, which meant originally 'stem, Reed', which gave birth to the name of the city of Tula or "Tollan" ('(place with abundant) reeds') and due to the cultural tradition of the Toltec City (originally ' inhabitant of Tula') came to acquire the sense of 'educated person'. Toltec ideas received the name of tōltēcayōtl 'toltequity' and were made up of religious, artistic and scientific formulas that reflected the Mesoamerican cosmovision.

The definition of the Toltecs as a historical or ethnic group is a fact established by researchers in a round table in 1941. Currently, new age groups claim very disparate things to justify the native use of the term Toltec:

Currently, the term "Toltec" is used by various New Age groups and by neo-nagualism practitioners. On the other hand, groups who claim to rescue the national identity roots assert without proof, having recuperated the original use of the name, applying it to anyone who follows the Toltec life principles; these are not validated by the Popper's falsifiability principle

Neo-Shamanism 

The idea of neo-shamanism groups, derived from the author Carlos Castaneda, is summarized in that a lifestyle can be lived with respect for elders, to obtain knowledge and preserve it without harming others.

From the neo-shamanism movement point of view, Ken Eagle mentions in his book similar topics as Carlos Castaneda, with the exception that makes connection with elements of the army of United States (Rangers) rather than the term originally used by Castaneda, Stalkers. In the book the Toltec path also recounts situations that appear to be alien channels, which removes historical seriousness from the term.

Carlos Castaneda refers generically to the Toltec as "secret conservators" in his book The Second Ring of Power, and in recent years a movement has been created divided into two parts, on the one hand the books by Don Miguel Ruiz, that shows a series of ideas or moral principles, and on the other hand a series of courses New Age type, that advertises on the handling of a return to the roots.

See also 
 Anahuac
 Carlos Castaneda
 Cē Ácatl Tōpīltzin Quetzalcóātl
 Nagualism
 Quetzalcóātl
 Tōltēca
 Toltec (Castaneda)

References

External links 

Toltecayotl

Mesoamerican cultures
Pre-Columbian cultures of Mexico
Pre-Columbian cultures
Classic period in the Americas
Neoshamanism
Toltec history